The R.L. Vaughan Center is a 5,000 seat multi-purpose arena in Elizabeth City, North Carolina. It was built in 1976. It is the home of the Elizabeth City State Vikings basketball and volleyball teams.

Basketball venues in North Carolina
Elizabeth City State University
Indoor arenas in North Carolina
College basketball venues in the United States
Sports venues in North Carolina
Sports venues in Pasquotank County, North Carolina
1976 establishments in North Carolina
Sports venues completed in 1976
College volleyball venues in the United States